The Split Rock Archeological Site comprises a series of river terraces south of the Sweetwater River in Fremont County, Wyoming. The terraces have yielded Native American artifacts from the Early Plains Archaic Period. Several housepit features were found in 1984 excavations. The site was placed on the National Register of Historic Places on May 4, 1987.

References

External links
 Split Rock Prehistoric Site at the Wyoming State Historic Preservation Office

National Register of Historic Places in Fremont County, Wyoming
Archaeological sites on the National Register of Historic Places in Wyoming